Faiq Jefri Bolkiah (born 9 May 1998) is a member of the Bruneian Royal Family and a professional footballer who plays as a midfielder for Thai League 1 club Chonburi. Born in the United States, he has represented and served as the captain of the Brunei national team.

Club career

Early career
In 2009, while as a member of A.F.C. Newbury, Bolkiah signed a one-year deal with the Southampton F.C. Academy. He was still with Southampton until at least December 2011. In 2014, Bolkiah signed a two-year youth contract with Chelsea of the Premier League after previously training with Reading and trialing with Arsenal. During his time with Arsenal, Bolkiah competed in the 2013 Lion City Cup against Corinthians, Eintracht Frankfurt, PSV Eindhoven, and a Singapore youth selection. He scored a goal in a 2–1 victory over the team from Singapore. With his contract with Chelsea set to expire in summer 2016, he left the team in December 2015. After a trial with Stoke City, he signed for Leicester City on a reported three-year professional contract in March 2016. He further signed a one-year extension to his deal in the summer of 2019.

Marítimo
On 23 September 2020, Bolkiah signed on a free transfer to Marítimo of Portugal's Primeira Liga. Three months later, he made his debut with under-23 team in a 3–3 home draw against Sporting CP U23 after being named in the starting line-up. Forty-five days later, he was named as a Marítimo substitute for the first time in a league match against Sporting CP.

On 11 April 2021, he made his senior debut for Marítimo B, coming on as a substitute in a 2–1 win over Gondomar.

Chonburi
In December 2021, Bolkiah joined Thai League 1 outift, Chonburi ahead of the second half of the 2021-22 season. He became the first ever Bruneian to join a Thai club. He scored his first goal for the club in a 1–0 victory against Port F.C. on 25 November 2022.

International career
Bolkiah was eligible to represent the United States and Brunei. He was scouted for the youth teams of the United States but chose to represent Brunei, doing so at the U19 and U23 levels  including at the 2015 Southeast Asian Games. In that tournament, he scored in a 1–2 defeat to Timor Leste. He was expected to make his senior international debut on 15 October 2016 in a 2016 AFF Championship qualification match against Timor-Leste. He debuted in the match, starting and playing the full 90 minutes of a 2–1 victory.

Personal life
Faiq is the son of Jefri Bolkiah, Prince of Brunei and nephew of Hassanal Bolkiah, the current Sultan of Brunei. He was born in Los Angeles  and holds both Bruneian and American citizenship. He was educated in Great Britain at Bradfield College. Bolkiah has been described as "the richest footballer in the world", with an estimated net worth of US$20 billion.

Career statistics

International

Scores and results list Brunei's goal tally first, score column indicates score after each Bolkiah goal.

References

External links
 

Living people
1998 births
Soccer players from Los Angeles
Association football midfielders
Bruneian footballers
Brunei international footballers
Bruneian expatriate footballers
American soccer players
American people of Bruneian descent
C.S. Marítimo players
American expatriate sportspeople in England
Bruneian expatriates in the United Kingdom
American expatriate sportspeople in Portugal
Expatriate footballers in England
Expatriate footballers in Portugal
Faiq Bolkiah
Faiq Bolkiah
Competitors at the 2015 Southeast Asian Games
Competitors at the 2017 Southeast Asian Games
Competitors at the 2019 Southeast Asian Games
American billionaires
Bruneian billionaires
Southeast Asian Games competitors for Brunei